In 1964 the South Sea Islands Museum was founded in Cooranbong, in New South Wales, Australia, to display artifacts collected by Seventh-day Adventist missionaries, who entered  Australia in 1885 and expanded into New Zealand, Papua New Guinea, Solomon Islands, Gilbert and Ellice Islands, Fiji, Tonga, Kiribati, Samoa, Cook Islands, Tahiti and Pitcairn Islands.

The museum displays headhunting gear, Pacific island weapons, carvings, idols, canoes and other artifacts in an 1896 building that was originally a house.

The records of the missionaries' work in Australia and in the South Sea Island region dating from the 1880s are held in the Adventist Heritage Centre which is located within the Library of the Avondale College of Higher Education at Cooranbong.  According to the Australian Department of the Environment and Heritage, "these rich and diverse records of provenance add to the significance of items in the museum."

History
As interest in the collection grew a decision was made to house the growing collection in a building of its own.  This building located at 27 Avondale Road, Cooranbong opened in 1964.

Exhibitions

The general exhibits change regularly, and a large war canoe permanently dominates one half of the building which also includes various themed exhibitions throughout the year.

The most visually arresting exhibit is a Solomon Islands war canoe.  Its arrival in Australia in 1968 was announced in the Sydney Morning Herald:

Giant War Canoe Arrives

"Once used for head-hunting raids in the Solomon Islands, this 52 foot war canoe arrived in Sydney ..., carefully "bandaged" in sacking as protection against souvenir hunters. The canoe was unloaded from the Burns Philip Freighter, Tulagi at Walsh Bay and will eventually be displayed at the Seventh-day Adventist Church's South Pacific Island Museum at Cooranbong, 80 miles north of Sydney".

Opening 
It is open Sunday, Wednesday and Saturday, 1400 to 1600, or by appointment.

See also

 Seventh-day Adventist Church
 Ellen G. White
 History of the Seventh-day Adventist Church
 Seventh-day Adventist Church Pioneers

References

External links

South Sea Islands Museum
The Adventist Heritage Centre

1964 establishments in Australia
Museums in New South Wales
History of the Seventh-day Adventist Church
Seventh-day Adventist missionaries in Australia
Ethnographic museums in Australasia
Anthropology museums
Museums established in 1964